Wave Race is a 1992 personal watercraft racing video game developed by Pax Softnica and published by Nintendo for the Nintendo Game Boy. It is the first game in the Wave Race series. The player controls a jet skier around a track aiming to beat the computer or up to three friends using the link cable accessory.

Gameplay
There are two modes in which the game may be played:

Slalom
The goal is to race through pairs of posts across the track. Each one passed through increases the player's score by one point. The player with the most points once all posts have been taken wins.

Race
A race in which the player must proceed through certain checkpoints and complete each lap in a time limit. Two powerups are available on the track. The dolphin gives the player increased turning ability, while the octopus allows the recipient to steal  from opponents.

In both modes, there are a variety of obstacles including ramps, shallow water and whirlpools. There are eight tracks for each mode.

The game includes sixteen courses. The tracks have obstacles (buoys, pylons) and jumps. Players begin at a slower class of watercraft and graduate to faster engines. Players can also use a limited turbo boost. The game features four-player multiplayer.

Reception
Nintendo Power wrote that the game successfully emulated the feel of watercraft racing. The reviewers praised the effect of skidding around corners, and recommended the four-player multiplayer experience. Power Unlimited gave the game a score of 71% writing: "This game is really something for speed buffs who love the Game Boy."

Sequels
Wave Race sold well enough to earn a Player's Choice medal. It was later followed by two sequels: Wave Race 64 and Wave Race: Blue Storm. Unlike the first game, Wave Race 64 and Wave Race: Blue Storm were also released in Japan.

In November 2016, Nintendo applied to renew the Wave Race trademark through EUIPO, hinting that the series may continue in the near future. During an interview with Fandom in April 2018, Wave Race producer Shinya Takahashi suggested that the series may see a revival on the Nintendo Switch.

References

External links

1992 video games
Game Boy games
Game Boy-only games
Multiplayer and single-player video games
Nintendo franchises
Nintendo Entertainment Analysis and Development games
Pax Softnica games
Personal watercraft racing video games
Video games developed in Japan